Point of origin may refer to:

 Point of Origin (film), a 2002 biographical crime film
 Point of Origin (novel), a crime fiction novel by Patricia Cornwell
 "Point of Origin", an episode of season 5 of the US medical drama ER
 "Point of Origin" (The Inside episode)
 Point of Origin (There for Tomorrow album), 2004
 Point of Origin (Person of Interest), 2014
 "Point of Origin" (The Twilight Zone), 2019 episode of the television series The Twilight Zone
 coordinate origin for a coordinate system

See also 
 Origin (disambiguation)